Jackson Matthew Holliday (born December 4, 2003) is an American professional baseball shortstop in the Baltimore Orioles organization. He was selected first overall by the Orioles in the 2022 Major League Baseball draft.

Amateur career
Holliday attended Stillwater High School in Stillwater, Oklahoma. After his freshman year, he committed to play college baseball at Oklahoma State University. As a junior in 2021, Holliday batted .500 with six home runs and fifty RBIs. He was also named the Central Oklahoma Athletic Conference Defensive Player of the Year. That summer, he played in various national events including the Perfect Game All-American Classic at Petco Park. He also was named to USA Baseball's 18U team.

Holliday entered his senior year in 2022 as a top prospect for the upcoming draft. During a game against Union High School, he hit three home runs. In another game, he hit two home runs in the same inning. He finished the season batting .685 with 17 home runs, 79 RBIs, 29 doubles, and thirty stolen bases over forty games. He set a national record for hits in a season for an amateur player with 89, surpassing the previous record of 88 set by J. T. Realmuto in 2010. He was named the Oklahoma Gatorade Baseball Player of the Year. He was the third in his family to win the award alongside his father and uncle. He was also awarded an ABCA/Rawlings Gold Glove.

Professional career 
The Baltimore Orioles selected Holliday with the first overall pick in the 2022 Major League Baseball draft. He signed with the team for $8.19 million, the largest signing bonus ever for a high school player.

Holliday made his professional debut on August 11, 2022 with the Rookie-level Florida Complex League Orioles, going 1 for 3 with a stolen base. He was later promoted to the Delmarva Shorebirds of the Single-A Carolina League. Over twenty games between both teams, he batted .297 with one home run, nine RBIs, and four stolen bases.

Personal life
Holliday is the son of former major leaguer and seven-time All-Star Matt Holliday. His brother, Ethan, also plays baseball at Stillwater and is committed to play college baseball for the Oklahoma State Cowboys baseball team. Holliday's uncle, Josh Holliday, is the head baseball coach at Oklahoma State.

Holliday is a Christian. He has said, "Faith plays a major role in baseball and my life. I want to honor the Lord in everything that I do and I try to represent that on the field, through my actions and how I carry myself on and off the field."

References

External links

2003 births
Living people
Baseball players from Oklahoma
Baseball shortstops
United States national baseball team players
Florida Complex League Orioles players
Delmarva Shorebirds players